Shane Melvon Jeffers, born 12 September 1981 at Sandy Point, St Kitts, is a West Indian cricketer who played first-class and List A cricket for the Leeward Islands.

References

1981 births
Living people
Kittitian cricketers
Leeward Islands cricketers
Saint Kitts representative cricketers
Rest of Leeward Islands cricketers
West Indies B cricketers
West Indian cricketers of the 21st century